Umi-Atzero Rural LLG is a local-level government (LLG) of Morobe Province, Papua New Guinea.

Wards
01. Ragiampun
02. Waritzian
03. Watarais
04. Atzunas
05. Marawasa
06. Wankun
07. Raginam
08. Rumpa
09. Yanuf
10. Numbugu
11. Ngarutzaniang
12. Samaran
13. Zumara
14. Mayamzariang
15. Tofmora
16. Arifiran
17. Dabu
18. Zumim
19. Antiragen
20. Gandisap
21. Sauruan
22. Marangits
23. Marangints
24. Mangiang
25. Binimamp
26. Nasawasiang
27. Sangan
28. Wafibampun
29. Zumangurun
30. Mutzing Station

References

Local-level governments of Morobe Province